This article is a comparison of notable mobile CRM systems.

ERP systems are considered a superset of CRM systems.

Introduction 
The market for mobile CRM applications is currently seeing record growth as new products and services around mobile CRM are being developed. The benefits of mobile CRM application have been demonstrated in a paper by Grandhi & Chugh (2012)  through the case of Dow Corning  and DirecTV where the introduction of SAP CRM system helped to improve their customer relations. Analysis of the two organisations revealed that mobile CRM applications are not only helping them to improve relationship with customers, but also helping to reduce the costs of acquiring new customers.

General 

Only stable releases are considered.

See also 
 Comparison of CRM systems
 List of ERP software packages (Enterprise Resource Planning)
 Customer relationship management (CRM)

References 

Customer relationship management software
CRM systems, Mobile